The 1994 Australian Indoor Championships was a men's tennis tournament played on indoor hard courts at the Sydney Entertainment Centre in Sydney, Australia and was part of the Championship Series of the 1994 ATP Tour. It was the 22nd and last edition of the tournament and was held from 3 through 10 October 1994. Seventh-seeded Richard Krajicek won the singles title.

Finals

Singles

 Richard Krajicek defeated  Boris Becker 7–6(7–5), 7–6(9–7), 2–6, 6–3
 It was Krajicek's 3rd singles title of the year and the 7th of his career.

Doubles

 Jacco Eltingh /  Paul Haarhuis defeated  Byron Black /  Jonathan Stark 6–4, 7–6
 It was Eltingh's 8th title of the year and the 22nd of his career. It was Haarhuis' 6th title of the year and the 19th of his career.

References

External links
 ITF tournament edition details

 
Australian Indoor Championships
Australian Indoor Tennis Championships
Ind
October 1994 sports events in Australia
Sports competitions in Sydney
Tennis in New South Wales